A total lunar eclipse took place on Monday, September 25, 1950 and Tuesday, September 26, 1950, the second of two total lunar eclipses in 1950. This total lunar eclipse was very shallow because it had an umbral eclipse magnitude of only 1.07834. This was the first of 27 total lunar eclipses of Saros cycle 136. Gamma had a value of 0.41012 and umbral eclipse magnitude of only 1.07834. Totality lasted 44 minutes and 16 seconds. The moon entered the penumbra at 01:21:40 UTC and exited the penumbra at 07:11:49 UTC on the same day (September 26, 1950). The moon entered the umbra at 02:31:47 UTC and exited at 06:01:34 UTC. Totality lasted 44 minutes and 16 seconds, between 03:54:28 UTC and 04:38:49 UTC.

This event followed the total solar eclipse of Tuesday, 12 September 1950. Occurring only 5 days (120 hours) before apogee (Apogee on October 1, 1950), the Moon's apparent diameter was smaller.

Visibility

Related eclipses

Lunar year series

See also
List of lunar eclipses
List of 20th-century lunar eclipses

Notes

External links

1950-09
1950 in science
September 1950 events